Gérgal is a municipality of Almería province, in the autonomous community of Andalusia, Spain.

The town is located at the foot of the southern side of the Sierra de Los Filabres.

Demographics

References

External links 

  Gérgal - Sistema de Información Multiterritorial de Andalucía
  Gérgal - Diputación Provincial de Almería

Municipalities in the Province of Almería